Rolan de la Cruz Biojó (3 October 1984) is a Colombian-born naturalized Equatoguinean footballer who plays for The Panthers in the Equatoguinean second division. Born in Colombia, he is an Equatorial Guinea international.

Career
Born in Tumaco, Colombia, De la Cruz had played club football in Colombia and Panama for Deportivo Cali, Deportivo Pasto, Santa Fe, Cortuluá, Árabe Unido and Fortaleza. In early 2013, De la Cruz was on trial in Colombian giant América de Cali (now in second division), but failed to sign.

He made his international debut for Equatorial Guinea in 2011.

Personal life
De la Cruz descends from Benkos Bioho, but this rebel slave was a native of the former Portuguese colony of Guinea-Bissau.

References

1984 births
Living people
People from Tumaco
Association football midfielders
Equatoguinean footballers
Equatorial Guinea international footballers
Colombian footballers
Equatoguinean people of Colombian descent
Equatoguinean people of Bissau-Guinean descent
Colombian people of Bissau-Guinean descent
Categoría Primera A players
Deportivo Cali footballers
Deportivo Pasto footballers
Independiente Santa Fe footballers
Cortuluá footballers
Liga Panameña de Fútbol players
C.D. Árabe Unido players
Colombian expatriate footballers
Colombian expatriate sportspeople in Panama
Expatriate footballers in Panama
Naturalized citizens of Equatorial Guinea
2012 Africa Cup of Nations players
The Panthers F.C. players
Sportspeople from Nariño Department